The "Standard Event System" (SES) to Study Vertebrate Embryos was developed in 2009 to establish a common language in comparative embryology. Homologous developmental characters are defined therein and should be recognisable in all vertebrate embryos. The SES includes a protocol on how to describe and depict vertebrate embryonic characters. The SES was initially developed for external developmental characters of organogenesis, particularly for turtle embryos. However, it is expandable both taxonomically and in regard to anatomical or molecular characters. This article should act as an overview on the species staged with SES and document the expansions of this system. New entries need to be validated based on the citation of scientific publications. The guideline on how to establish new SES-characters and to describe species can be found in the original paper of Werneburg (2009). 
SES-characters are used to reconstruct ancestral developmental sequences in evolution such as that of the last common ancestor of placental mammals. Also the plasticity of developmental characters can be documented and analysed.

SES-staged species 

Overview on the vertebrate species staged with SES.

SES-characters 

New SES-characters are continuously described in new publications.  Currently, characters of organogenesis are described for Vertebrata (V), Gnathostomata (G), Tetrapoda (T), Amniota (A), Sauropsida (S), Squamata (SQ), Mammalia (M), and Monotremata (MO). In total, 166 SES-characters are currently defined.

References 

Embryology